Gourvenec is a surname. Notable people with the surname include:

 Camille Gourvenec, French spy
 Gwendolyn Gourvenec, French actress
 Susan Gourvenec, British geoscientist